Anthea Stewart (born 7 February 1959) is a British former professional tennis player. Her maiden name is Cooper.

Stewart, ranked as high as seventh in United Kingdom, was active on tour in the 1970 and 1980s. She played in four singles main draws at Wimbledon and also qualified once for the US Open. One of her Wimbledon appearances was a first round loss to American rising star Andrea Jaeger in 1980.

References

External links
 
 

1959 births
Living people
British female tennis players